Martin Raftery is a former professional rugby league footballer who played in the 1970s.

Medical career
Raftery was one of the inaugural Fellows of the Australasian College of Sport and Exercise Physicians. He has worked as team doctor for St. George Illawarra and Australian Wallabies. He is currently Chief Medical Officer for World Rugby.

References

Cronulla-Sutherland Sharks players
Rugby league five-eighths
Australian sports physicians